Al-Ahli Club of Atbara is a football club from Atbara, Sudan. They play in the top level of Sudanese professional football, the Sudan Premier League.Their home stadium is Atbara Stadium. It has a capacity of 13,000.

Achievements

Atbara League

Performance in CAF competitions
CAF Confederation Cup: 1 appearance
2014 – Preliminary Round

Current Squad 2018

External links
Team profile – footballdatabase.eu

Football clubs in Sudan